James Scaysbrook (born 1 January 1982) is a retired English rugby union player who played for Exeter Chiefs. He is now the defence coach for Coventry RFC.

Career 
Scaysbrook joined Exeter Chiefs from Bath Rugby in 2009. While at Bath Rugby Scaysbrook was called up to the England Saxons squad in February 2007 for their Six Nations games against Italy and Ireland.

After returning to the Aviva Premiership with Exeter in 2010/11 season, Scaysbrook was nominated for the 2011/12 Aviva Premiership Player of the season.

Appointed as head coach of Plymouth Albion R.F.C. on 11 December 2019.

References

External links 
 Exeter Chiefs Profile
 Premiership Rugby Profile
 England profile

1982 births
Living people
Bath Rugby players
English rugby union players
Exeter Chiefs players
Rugby union flankers
Rugby union players from Birmingham, West Midlands